Buzovyazy (Boźayaź) is a rural locality (a selo) and the administrative centre of Buzovyazovsky Selsoviet, Karmaskalinsky District, Bashkortostan, Russia. The population was 1,492 as of 2010. There are 12 streets.

Geography 
Buzovyazy is located 27 km southwest of Karmaskaly (the district's administrative centre) by road. Buzovyazbash is the nearest rural locality.

References 

Rural localities in Karmaskalinsky District